Frank Horton may refer to:

 Frank Horton (New York politician) (1919–2004), United States Representative from New York
 Frank Horton (physicist) (1878–1957), British physicist
 Frank L. Horton (1918–2004), American antiques dealer and museum director 
 Frank O. Horton (1882–1948), United States Representative from Wyoming
 Frank Reed Horton (1896–1966), United States educator
 Frank E. Horton (born 1939), American educator and administrator